The Bergamasco Autonomist Movement (Movimento Autonomista Bergamasco in Italian language, Moviment Autonomista Bergamasch in Lombard language) was an autonomist, federalist and anti-fascist party founded in 1956 by Guido Calderoli, dentist and grandfather of the current Italian politician Roberto Calderoli.

History 
An autonomist movement in the area of Bergamo there was since the end of the World War II because the Italian Constitution created, but not activated, Regions. So a movement linked to the Italian Republican Party and its MP Giulio Bergmann started asking their activation. In 1956 this movement became a Party which run for the municipal and provincial elections and they won a seat in each assembly, sending Calderoli, later substituted by Gianfranco Gonella, in the Municipal Council and Ugo Gavazzeni in the Province Council.

In 1958 Calderoli decided to run with other autonomist parties from Lombardy and the entire Northern Italy founding then the Autonomist Lombard Regional Movement and the Autonomist Padanian Regional Movement, which run in the upcoming national election to the Senate. They earn no seats and had a loss of votes, which made the majority of the MAB to go to into the Christian Democracy in 1960 with a minority which made a new party called "Autonomists" which loses all the formerly-MAB seats and then disbanded soon later.

Political views 
The MAB substained self-government for Regions and territory but not the secession and for a strong respect for regional languages, which they asked to be used in schools and by public servants. They had an anti-meridionalist view justified by the idea that a country which needs an important amount of internal migration is a weak country.

They had a strong anti-fascist view and thought a decentralized country's less likely to have an authoritarian drift and government: some of its program was based on documents made by the Lombards Catholics "Green Partisans".

Links with the Northern League 
Some describes the MAB as an ideological ancestor of the Northern League and there are some point of commonality as some important differences.

Both parties had a common vision about autonomy, local cultures and Rome being an oppressive bureaucratic centre, but they differed on the vision about Italy: the MAB was in favour of a united country while the Northern League even advocated independence. Some mottos and symbols of the MAB were later reused by the League like the "golden goose" which eggs are taken by Rome or the Warrior of Legnano, and some hypothesise that Innocente Calderoli, Guido's son and early League activist, had a role on the acquisition of the old mottos.

References 
The Movimento Autonomista Bergamasco and the Lega Nord: continuities and discontinuities

Lombard nationalist parties
Federalist parties in Italy
Political parties established in 1956
Political parties disestablished in 1960